This was the first edition of the event.

Mike Bauer and David Rikl won the title, defeating Christer Allgårdh and Brian Devening 7–6, 6–4 in the final.

Seeds

  Sergio Casal /  Emilio Sánchez (first round)
  Mark Koevermans /  Greg Van Emburgh (first round)
  Tomás Carbonell /  Byron Talbot (first round)
  Pablo Albano /  Javier Frana (semifinals)

Draw

Draw

References

External links
 Draw

Chile Open (tennis)
1993 ATP Tour